Drzewica Castle - a Gothic-Renaissance castle built between 1527 and 1535 by Archbishop of Gniezno Maciej Drzewicki. The Archbishop built the castle on the peripheries of the town, by the river Drzewiczka and encircled the fortress with moats, separated by a bulwark. The building's plan is based on a regular rectangular shape. Its defence systems are based on four square towers located in each corner of the castle. The building burned down in 1814, remaining a well preserved ruin. Thus, the castle did not undergo any later modifications, remaining one of Poland's best preserved residences from the first part of the sixteenth-century.

See also
Drzewica
Castles in Poland

References

Castles in Łódź Voivodeship